Granard was a constituency represented in the Irish House of Commons until 1800.

History
In the Patriot Parliament of 1689 summoned by James II, Granard was not represented.

Members of Parliament, 1679–1801

1689–1801

Notes

References

Bibliography

Constituencies of the Parliament of Ireland (pre-1801)
Historic constituencies in County Longford
1679 establishments in Ireland
1800 disestablishments in Ireland
Constituencies established in 1679
Constituencies disestablished in 1800